, also known as Umizaru 2: Test of Trust is a 2006 Japanese action drama film directed by Eiichiro Hasumi. It is the second feature-length film and third of the Umizaru projects, set after the film Umizaru and the 11-episode drama series Umizaru Evolution. The film stars Hideaki Itō as Japan Coast Guard (JCG) rescue diver Daisuke Senzaki, and Ai Kato as his love interest Kanna Izawa. It is the second of the 3 part film and television project, which is adapted from the popular manga series Umizaru by Shūhō Satō.

Umizaru (海猿) means "Sea Monkey"; a derogatory label slapped on the rescue diver trainees by local townsfolk of the city of Kure due to their excessive and uninhibited behaviour during off hours.

The film recorded the 2nd highest-ever box office grossing in Japan, trailing only Bayside Shakedown 2. The opening weekend of the film was a phenomenal 442% improvement on the opening weekend takings of the first film Umizaru.

Hideaki Itō, the male lead, has a Divemaster license awarded by PADI Japan; a professional diving qualification. The theme song is Precious, from vocalist Yuna Ito.

Plot
Following the decommissioning of the patrol vessel Nagare (ながれ), Daisuke Senzaki, now a Japan Coast Guard (JCG) rescue diver, is posted to the 10th Region Mobile Rescue Unit, based at Kagoshima Air Station. A plane crashes in the stormy seas, where Senzaki battles the elements to keep two victims alive, as he struggles to keep everyone on a wreckage which has become their lifeboat. Senzaki is only able to hold onto an adult male, while a young boy struggles to hang on by himself. Senzaki manages to keep the boy alive, but the heroic gesture by the man drowns from sacrifice. He soon becomes plagued with guilt and self-doubt due to this episode, as he had pledged not to let anymore victims die.

Senzaki's girlfriend Kanna Izawa takes time off her job and travels a long distance by car to see him. As the couple check into a hotel, Izawa locks herself out of her room, forcing her to spring a handmade wedding dress surprise on Senzaki, accompanied by a fashion designer. Izawa intended to fulfill the plans of marriage. Senzaki, still traumatised, is not prepared for marital commitments, and his reluctance drives a wedge between the two. Izawa leaves heartbroken in spite of the best efforts of Senzaki's buddy, Tetsuya Yoshioka, to mediate.

En route to a routine training exercise, news arrives that a passenger ferry, the Clover, has run aground with 4 hours left to evacuate. Senzaki and Yoshioka are among the first divers on site, deployed by helicopter. Their stark prognosis of the ship's fate is compounded by revelations from Coast Guard crisis command: 620 passengers, 195 fuel-laden vehicles, with limited time to escape. Senzaki's rescue efforts takes a dramatic turn when he discovers his girlfriend Izawa on board. The disheartened Izawa had chosen to take the ferry instead of driving home as a fateful decision. Senzaki tells Izawa to abandon her belongings and proceed to the lifeboats, including the handmade wedding dress. As the couple part ways, Izawa asks for Senzaki's reassurance that they will meet again afterwards.

While attending to an injured pregnant staff member, Megumi Honma, Senzaki becomes separated from the rest of his team as Homma informs him of a faster route to the escape hatches. The shortcut brings them to the vehicle deck of the ferry, where they meet an irritable passenger, Shinichi Ebihara, tending to his precious Ferrari. A sudden lurch wreaks havoc on the vehicles and ignites the petroleum, causing a massive explosion. The fire forces the 4 scrambling for cover on another deck where they become disoriented; trapped with no idea where to go. Ebihara eventually suffers an injury to his left thigh. They radio for help and find a duct in the room bears the markings "68-4T".

The frantic JCG crisis command centre tries to locate the room which the 4 are trapped in, as Shimokawa and other officers pore over the schematics of the ship, desperate for some feasible route of escape. Shimokawa decides they have no choice but to swim underwater to attempt an escape into another level of the ship. Despite protests of the others, Shimokawa insists that his route is the only option left. Senzaki and Yoshioka bring the pregnant Honma and injured Ebihara through the perilous underwater swim,  The 4 eventually complete the swim into another level which was yet unflooded and remain there.

As the last of the passengers have been evacuated, Senzaki, Yoshioka and the 2 victims are the only ones unaccounted for, still cut off from radio contact with no help. Shimokawa, since his promotion to shore command position from his days with Senzaki on the Nagare, is forced to grapple with a tough decision: to continue the recovery of the missing 4 with other rescue divers or withdrawing all teams to avoid suffering casualties in a likely fruitless rescue attempt. Further explosions and casualties force Shimokawa to withdraw other divers; a decision met with great disdain and frustration from the on-site divers who comply with reluctance.

Now safe on shore, Izawa notices the return of the rescue divers from the sinking ship and worriedly inquires the whereabouts of her boyfriend. Her worst fears are confirmed when JCG officials make the press release stating the names of the missing divers and passengers, and that rescue efforts have been suspended due to the danger posed to rescuers, as she watches helplessly at the raging inferno on Clover, while the JCG command has little idea where to proceed and must make more swift decisions, awaiting their confirmation of success by radio...

Cast

Sequels
Umizaru 3: The Last Message, released September 18, 2010.
 Brave Hearts: Umizaru, released July 13, 2012.

References

External links
 Official site
 

2006 films
2000s action drama films
Films directed by Eiichirō Hasumi
2000s Japanese-language films
Japanese sequel films
Live-action films based on manga
Umizaru
2006 drama films
Films scored by Naoki Satō